The Aders's duiker (Cephalophus adersi), also known as nunga in Swahili, kunga marara in Kipokomo and harake in Giriama, is a small, forest-dwelling duiker found only in Zanzibar and Kenya. It may be a subspecies of the red, Harvey's, or Peters's duiker or a hybrid of a combination of these.  It is named after W. Mansfield Aders, a zoologist with the Zanzibar Government Service.

Characteristics

Its weight varies greatly depending on geographical location; those in eastern Zanzibar weigh , while those in the south weigh only . Its coat is reddish-brown, grayer on the neck, and lighter down the backside and underneath. A small red crest runs along the head. The muzzle is pointed, and the nose has a flat front.

Distribution and habitat

Aders's duikers live primarily in coastal forests and woodlands in Africa. The species can live in quite dry scrub near the sea or among coral outcrops; in Zanzibar, they are restricted to tall thicket forest growing on waterless coral rag. In Arabuko Sokoke (Kenya), they are most often trapped within Cynometra vegetation, especially on "red soil". C. adersi is sympatric with C. harveyi on the mainland and with C. monticola sundevalli on Zanzibar, although nothing is known regarding their ecological separation.

Ecology and behavior

The species is very shy, alert, and sensitive to sound. As a result, common methods of hunting include the brute-force method of driving the duikers into nets with dogs, or silent ambush at feeding sites.

Aders's duikers live in coastal forests, thickets and woodlands, where they eat flowers, leaves, and fruit which has fallen from the forest canopy. The species appears to be diurnal, as it is rarely seen active at night. Typical feeding patterns are from dawn to late morning, which is followed by a period of rest and rumination. At midafternoon, Aders's duikers generally become active, and will continue foraging until nightfall.

They are generally solitary or found in small groups of two or three. They often pick up scraps dropped by monkeys and birds foraging in the trees.

The species shows a particular dependence on the flowers and berries which grow prolifically from trees common to the area, such as ebony (Diospyros consolataei), kudu berry (Cassine aethiopica) and bush guarri (Euclea schimperi), and bushes such as turkey berry (Canthium spp.) and Polyspheria. In addition to these, they will eat sprouts, buds, and other fresh growth found at ground level. This duiker species can apparently manage without drinking, getting most of the hydration they need from their diets.

These duikers have extremely specific habitat requirements, being found only in areas of old-growth thicket, with the highest population densities (11.4±5.18 per km2) recorded in relatively undisturbed high thicket. However, Kanga (1999) did report some Aders's duikers in secondary thicket. In the Arabuko-Sokoke Forest in Kenya, Aders's duikers inhabit regions of Cyanometra forest.

Not much is known of its reproductive habits, although they may breed all year long.

Conservation

They are threatened by habitat destruction, feral dogs, and overhunting. They are particularly sought by humans due to their soft skin and meat. The population in Zanzibar had declined from 5000 in 1983 to 640 in 1999, and it will probably continue to decrease rapidly. In Kenya, the duiker is present at very low densities, though the decline is probably not as severe as the other population.

Several conservation plans have been made, and a captive-breeding program has been proposed.

References

External links 
 Aders’s duiker at ARKive
 Aders’s duiker at ultimateungulate

Aders's duiker
Zanzibar
Mammals of Kenya
Aders's duiker
Aders's duiker